Tracey Skoyles (born 1967) is an Irish former cricketer who played as a right-handed batter. She appeared in five One Day Internationals for Ireland in 1997 and 1998, including playing at the 1997 World Cup.

References

External links 
 
 

1967 births
Living people
Date of birth missing (living people)
Place of birth missing (living people)
Irish women cricketers
Ireland women One Day International cricketers